Bhabhi Ki Chudiyan is a 1961 Hindi-language drama film directed by Sadashiv J. Row Kavi, starring Meena Kumari and Balraj Sahni. It is a remake of the 1953 Marathi film Vahinichya Bangdya.

Plot
Geeta (Meena Kumari) is married to Shyam (Balraj Sahni), but is unable to bear children. Orphaned as a youth, Mohan (Sailesh Kumar) is raised by his elder brother Shyam and his wife, Geeta, who offers the boy motherly love and devotion. Mohan marries Prabha (Seema Deo), Prabha is from a wealthy family and her life is ruled over by her dominating mom (Durga Khote). Mohan's youthful bride becomes jealous of his loyalty to his family. Misunderstandings arise to such an extent that Prabha moves out of her home, and back to her mom's. She gives birth to a baby, and not even her husband comes to visit her or to see the baby. But when the infant falls ill, Prabha must set aside her apprehension and learn to trust.

Cast
Balraj Sahni as Shyam
Meena Kumari as Geeta
Sailesh Kumar as Mohan
Seema Deo as Prabha
Durga Khote as Prabha's Mother
Om Prakash as Prabha's Father

Music

Jyoti Kalash Chhalke, sung by Lata Mangeshkar, is composed in Raag Bhupali and is widely regarded as one of the best Raag Bhupali-based Bollywood compositions.

External links

References

1961 films
1960s Hindi-language films
Films scored by Sudhir Phadke